William Allan McKinnon  (23 February 1931 – 10 December 1988) was a senior Australian public servant. He was Secretary of the Department of Immigration and Ethnic Affairs between 1983 and 1987.

Early life
Bill McKinnon was born on 23 February 1931.

Career
As General Manager, later Director, of the Australian Industry Development Corporation between 1972 and 1976, McKinnon played a major role establishing and developing the corporation. He moved to the Industries Assistance Commission in 1976, serving there as Deputy Chairman and then Chairman.

McKinnon was appointed Secretary of the Department of Immigration and Ethnic Affairs in 1983. As head of the Immigration department, he oversaw transition of immigration considerations to an environment where the department was more concerned with the economic viability of immigrants.

In 1987, McKinnon lost his job as head of the Department, perhaps due to his role in the approval of Australian residency for Taj El-Din Hilaly, a prominent Sydney Sunni Muslim leader. Paul Keating had personally approved Sheik Hilali's residency while Acting Prime Minister during a period that Prime Minister Bob Hawke was away.

McKinnon went from his Secretary role into a position as the Australian High Commissioner to New Zealand.

Awards
McKinnon was made a Commander of the Order of the British Empire in December 1982.

References

1931 births
1988 deaths
Australian public servants
Australian Commanders of the Order of the British Empire
Secretaries of the Australian Government Immigration Department
High Commissioners of Australia to New Zealand